The 1996 Dallas Burn season was the inaugural season of the Major League Soccer team. It was the first time since 1981 that the Dallas-Fort Worth metroplex had a professional soccer team. The team made the playoffs for the first time in franchise history.

Final standings

Western Conference

Overall table

Regular season

Results by round

Match Results

MLS Cup Playoffs

Western Conference semifinals

U.S. Open Cup

External links
 Season statistics

1996
Dallas Burn
Dallas Burn
Dallas Burn